Many ships have been named New York, including:

Merchant ships 
 , a 524-gross-register-ton Long Island Sound steamboat operating between New York and New Haven, Connecticut; later went to the Hudson River as a towboat, abandoned 1875. 
 , in packet service between New York City and Charleston, South Carolina; later in the Gulf of Mexico, destroyed by a hurricane in 1846
 , a transatlantic passenger liner of Glasgow & New York Steamship Company, wrecked in Scotland in 1858
 , a transatlantic passenger liner of North German Lloyd; converted in 1875 to ship-rigged sailing vessel New York, and wrecked in 1891 
 , an excursion steamer of Hudson River Line, destroyed by fire in 1908
 , named City of New York until 1893; later served in U.S. Navy as USS Harvard in the Spanish–American War, and as USS Plattsburg in World War I
 , a passenger ferry of the New York, Philadelphia and Norfolk Railroad destroyed by fire in 1932
 , a seagoing tugboat 1941–1952, built as Catawissa for the Philadelphia and Reading Railroad and scrapped in 2008
 , built for the Sandy Hook Pilots, later commissioned as 
 , oil tanker, owned by Texaco until broken up in 1950. 
 , former name of Pan Kraft, an American cargo ship bombed and sunk by Germany in 1942
 , later name of 16,991 GRT transatlantic liner Tuscania
 , a transatlantic liner of Hamburg America Line, heavily damaged in 1945
 , 779 GRT,  industrial vessel, USCG ID 539474, winter station pilot boat owned by United NY Sandy Hook Pilots Assoc.

Naval ships
 , a gundalow built on Lake Champlain in 1776 that participated in the Battle of Valcour Island.
 , a 36-gun frigate commissioned in 1800 and burned by the British in 1814.
 , a 74-gun ship of the line laid down in 1820 which never left the stocks and was burned in 1861.
 A screw sloop named  Ontario laid down in 1863; renamed New York in 1869, and sold while still on the stocks, in 1888.
 ,  an armored cruiser commissioned in 1893, in action in the Spanish–American War, renamed to Saratoga in 1911, renamed Rochester in 1917, decommissioned in 1933, and scuttled in 1941.
 , a battleship laid down in 1911, commissioned in 1914, in action in both World Wars. Decommissioned in 1946 was used in both aerial and submerged atomic bomb tests that year. Surviving both, she was towed back to Pearl Harbor as a target ship and sunk following a massive assault by ships and planes in 1948.
 , a Los Angeles-class submarine launched in 1977 and retired in 1997.
 , an amphibious transport dock launched in 2007 and commissioned in November 2009.

See also
 List of ships named City of New York
 List of ships named New York City

References

 

Ship names
ships named New York
New York (state)-related lists